A churrascaria  is a place where meat is cooked in churrasco style, which translates roughly from the Portuguese word for "barbecue". 

Churrascaria cuisine is typically (but not always) served rodízio style, where roving waiters serve the barbecued meats from large skewers directly onto the seated diners' plates.

Terminology
Related terminology comes from the Portuguese language.  A churrasqueiro is somebody who cooks churrasco style food in a churrascaria restaurant or at home. A churrasqueira is a barbecue grill used for this style of cooking.

History
Distinctly a South American style rotisserie, it owes its origins to the fireside roasts of the gaúchos of southern Brazil, Argentina, and Uruguay, traditionally from the Pampa region, centuries ago.

Contemporary churrascarias
In modern restaurants rodízio service is typically offered.  (meat waiters) come to the table with knives and a skewer, on which are speared various kinds of meat, be it beef, pork, filet mignon, lamb, chicken, duck, ham (with pineapple), sausage, fish, or any other sort of local cut of meat. A common cut of beef top sirloin cap is known as picanha. In addition to the table service, a self-service buffet of salad, bread, rice, and farofa is offered.

Brazil
In most parts of Brazil, the churrasco is roasted over charcoal. In the south of Brazil, however, mostly close to the borders of Argentina and Uruguay, embers of wood are also used.

Portugal
Throughout Portugal there are various  grills located in towns, cities, and also by the roadside on national highways. While churrasqueira restaurants offer the typical fare of barbecued  (chicken), beef or pork, they may also offer rotisserie chicken and a variety of other culinary dishes.

United States
Churrascaria cuisine combined with rodízio style service has become more popular in the US, expanding to a number of cities.

See also

 Churrasqueira
Culinary arts

References 

Restaurants by type
Barbecue
Food and drink in Brazil
Food and drink in Portugal